The United Kingdom of Great Britain and Northern Ireland competed as Great Britain at the 1998 Winter Olympics in Nagano, Japan.

Medallists

Alpine skiing

Men

Men's combined

Women

Biathlon

Men

 1 A penalty loop of 150 metres had to be skied per missed target.
 2 One minute added per missed target.

Bobsleigh

Curling

Men's tournament

Group stage
Top four teams advanced to semi-finals.

|}

Contestants

Women's tournament

Group stage
Top four teams advanced to semi-finals.

|}

Medal Round
Semi-final

Bronze medal game

Contestants

Figure skating

Men

Freestyle skiing

Men

Short track speed skating

Men

References
Official Olympic Reports
International Olympic Committee results database
 Olympic Winter Games 1998, full results by sports-reference.com

Nations at the 1998 Winter Olympics
1998
Olympics
Winter sports in the United Kingdom